Engerth may refer to:-

People
Wilhelm Freiherr von Engerth (1814-1884), an Austrian engineer.
Edouard von Engerth, a nineteenth-century Austrian artist.

Transportation
Engerth locomotive, an early form of articulated locomotive, invented by Wilhelm Freiherr von Engerth (see above).